Nordic popular music, also referred to as Scandinavian popular music, includes pop and rock music of the Nordic countries. The musical scene is known for its biggest bands like ABBA, Roxette, A-ha, Michael Learns to Rock, Ace of Base, Aqua, and Bladee. These are by far the biggest non-metal acts to come out of Sweden, Norway and Denmark.

The popular music of the Nordic countries exhibits great diversity. Denmark, Finland, Iceland, Norway and Sweden have all had successful domestic record industries for many years. Because the Baltic countries of Estonia, Latvia and Lithuania were under Soviet control for much of the 20th century, when recording technology and popular music spread around the world, those three countries have a more tenuous connection with the popular industries of Finland, Sweden and the rest. However, since the fall of the Soviet Union, Western popular music in general has gained audiences in the Baltic states; this includes popular music from the other Nordic nations, as well as the United Kingdom, United States and elsewhere.

The Nordic metal scene is highly visible compared to other genres from the region. Many big names such as Dimmu Borgir, Lordi, Mercyful Fate, Blind Channel, Skalmold, Hamferd, Mnemic, Opeth, Meshuggah, Children of Bodom, Amon Amarth, LAMORI from Aland and to an extent Estonia's Metsatoll - if considering Estonia as Nordic, hail from Nordic nations. Nordic or Scandinavian metal bands have had a long and lasting influence on the metal subculture alongside their counterparts in Great Britain and The United States.

Nordic number-one hits on the Billboard Hot 100

Nordic number-one singles in the UK

Some notable artists by country

Denmark

 Alphabeat
 Aqua
 Aura Dione
 Barcode Brothers
 Christopher Nissen
 Emmelie de Forest
 Infernal
 Junior Senior
 Kato
 Lukas Graham
 Martin Jensen
 Medina
 Michael Learns to Rock
 MØ
 Safri Duo
 Volbeat
 Whigfield

Faroe Islands

 Eivør
 Synarchy
 Týr

Finland

 Alma
 Anna Abreu
 Apocalyptica
 Benjamin Peltonen
 Blind Channel
 Bomfunk MC's
 Darude
 Hanoi Rocks
 HIM
 Isac Elliot
 Krista Siegfrieds
 Lordi
 Nightwish
 The Rasmus
 Sara Forsberg
 LAMORI - from Aland

Iceland

 Björk
 Emilíana Torrini
 GusGus
 Kaleo
 Of Monsters and Men
 Sigur Rós
 Skalmold
 Svala

Norway

 A1
 A-ha
 Alan Walker
 Ane Brun
 Annie (singer)
 Astrid S
 Aurora
 Bel Canto
 Broiler
 Cashmere Cat
 Christine Guldbrandsen
 Dagny
 Dance with a Stranger
 Dimmu Borgir
 Donkeyboy
 D'Sound
 Fra Lippo Lippi
 Flunk
 Highasakite
 Ida Maria
 Ina Wroldsen
 Jarle Bernhoft
 Katzenjammer
 Kaizers Orchestra
 Kate Havnevik
 KEiiNO
 Kings of Convenience
 Kygo
 Leaves' Eyes
 Lene Marlin
 Lemaitre
 Lido
 Madcon
 Marcus & Martinus
 Maria Mena
 Marit Larsen
 Matoma
 M2M
 Moyka (singer)
 Nico & Vinz
 Röyksopp
 Sandra Lyng
 SeeB
 Secret Garden
 Sigrid
 Sirenia
 Sissel
 Susanne Sundfør
 Stargate
 Theatre of Tragedy
 Thomas Bergersen
 TNT
 Tungevaag & Raaban
 Turbonegro
 Tristania
 Wardruna
 Ylvis

By 2016, Norway had the 20th largest global music market. Currently four Norwegian artists have achieved a Top 10 placement on the Billboard Hot 100, including A-ha's "Take On Me" which went to 1st place in 1985, Ylvis' "The Fox" which went to 6th place in 2013, Nico & Vinz's "Am I Wrong" which went to 4th place in 2014, and Kygo's "It Ain't Me" which went to 10th place in 2017.

Sweden

A*Teens
ABBA
Ace of Base
A.C.T
Agnes Carlsson
Alesso
Amon Amarth
Aronchupa
Avicii
Basshunter
Benjamin Ingrosso
Bladee
Blue Swede
Bosson
Boy In Space
Crazy Frog
Da Buzz
Darin
Dr. Alban
Eagle-Eye Cherry
Elliphant
Eric Prydz
E-Type
Europe
First Aid Kit
Felix Sandman
Galantis
Garmarna
Ghost
Hives
Icona Pop
John Martin
Little Dragon
Leila K
Loreen
Lykke Li
Meja
Mohombi
Miike Snow
Miss Li
Neneh Cherry
Opeth
Otto Knows
Play
Rednex
Roxette
Robyn
Sabaton (band)
Seinabo Sey
September
SHY Martin
Swedish House Mafia
Teddybears
The Cardigans
Therion
Tove Lo
Yung Lean
Zara Larsson

Further reading

References

Nordic music
Danish music
Finnish music
Icelandic music
Norwegian music
Swedish music
Popular music by country